Sergey Gennadievich Bashkirov (born December 17, 1971, in Siberia), known as Sergey Bashkirov, is a contemporary Russian painter.

Early life and education
Bashkirov was born in Siberia on December 17, 1971. He graduated from two different universities in St. Petersbrug. One of them - the Sport Academy named after Lesgaft (major- hockey trainer) and the other one - the East European Institute of psychoanalysis (major- psychological correction and positive psychology). 
He furthered his career in Northern India. For 12 years, Bashkirov was living and studying at the university of Human Ecology in Northern India (major - Yoga Trainer and Art Therapist).
Currently he lives and works in St-Petersburg. He has his own studio in the heart of the city.

Works
In 2006, being impressed by the exhibition of Filonov, he first tried painting. Today, after several years of experiments and studies of various schools of painting, Bashkirov is concentrated on abstract  and colorful vision, using different techniques.  
He uses hardened brushes, spatula, and even his hands as paint applicators. Bashkirov's technique of pouring, sprinkling paint gives the impression of spontaneity. In his paintings a wide gamma of colours is used and still they are harmonic for the viewer.

Exhibitions
2011, 8–22 January, St.Petersburg, Annual exhibition for artists from St.Petersburg
2010, 1–5 December, Moscow, Art Manezh(Арт Манеж)
2010, St.Petersburg, Restaurant "Volna"
2010, St.Petersburg, Gallery "Zerkalo"
2010, St.Petersburg, private exhibition "Unbearable easiness of beings"
2010, St.Petersburg, private exhibition "Iron heart"

References

Catalog for the annual exhibition for artists from St.Petersburg, 2011, Published by the St.Petersburg's cultural committee
Lyashko Anna, 2010, Catalogue published by Hirsch art company

External links
Official website

1971 births
Abstract expressionist artists
Russian contemporary artists
Living people
20th-century Russian painters
Russian male painters
21st-century Russian painters
20th-century Russian male artists
21st-century Russian male artists